Muirgheas Ua hEidhin (died 1180) was King of Uí Fiachrach Aidhne.

References
 Irish Kings and High-Kings, Francis John Byrne (2001), Dublin: Four Courts Press, 
 CELT: Corpus of Electronic Texts at University College Cork

People from County Galway
1180 deaths
12th-century Irish monarchs
Year of birth unknown